Sergiy Breus (born 30 January 1983) is a butterfly swimmer from Ukraine, who won the gold medal in the men's 50 m butterfly at the 2004 European Long Course Championships in Madrid, Spain.

External links

References

Ukrainian male swimmers
Male butterfly swimmers
1983 births
People from Brovary
Living people
Place of birth missing (living people)
World Aquatics Championships medalists in swimming
Olympic swimmers of Ukraine
Swimmers at the 2008 Summer Olympics
Medalists at the FINA World Swimming Championships (25 m)
European Aquatics Championships medalists in swimming
Universiade medalists in swimming
Kyiv National University of Trade and Economics alumni
Universiade gold medalists for Ukraine
Universiade silver medalists for Ukraine
Sportspeople from Kyiv Oblast